An election was held on November 8, 2016 to elect all 99 members to Ohio's House of Representatives. The election coincided with the elections for other offices, including U.S. President, U.S. Senate, U.S. House of Representatives and state senate. The primary election was held on March 15, 2016.

Republicans consolidated their supermajority in the House by gaining one seat, winning 66 seats compared to 33 seats for the Democrats.

Results

Statewide

District
Results of the 2016 Ohio House of Representatives election by district:

References

Ohio House of Representatives
House of Representatives
2016